The 1996 Fresno mayoral election was held on March 26, 1996 to elect the mayor of Fresno, California. It saw the reelection of Jim Patterson.

Since Patterson won a majority in the first round, no runoff was required.

Results

References 

1996 California elections
Mayoral elections in Fresno, California
Fresno